Black Reef,  el. , is a small mountain range west of Augusta, Montana in Lewis and Clark County, Montana.

See also
 List of mountain ranges in Montana

Notes

Mountain ranges of Montana
Landforms of Lewis and Clark County, Montana